Mary Louise Reed (née Case; October 20, 1930) is an American politician and environmentalist. She served as a member of the Idaho Senate for the 4th district from 1984 to 1996.

Early life and education 
A native of Klamath Falls, Oregon, Reed earned a Bachelor of Arts degree from Mills College, where she studied art history and religion. She also took graduate courses at Columbia University, the Union Theological Seminary, and Whitworth University.

Career 
After marrying her husband, Reed lived in Montana and Washington before settling in Coeur d'Alene, Idaho. Reed founded the Coeur d’Alene’s Human Rights Education Institute and worked as an activist in the Idaho Panhandle region. In 1975, she advocated for the passage of the Local Land Use Planning Act. Reed is a founder of the Kootenai Environmental Alliance and Idaho Conservation League, along with her husband, an environmental lawyer.

In 1984, Reed was elected to the Idaho Senate. Representing the 4th district, Reed served for 12 years before her retirement.

Personal life 
Reed has two children, including political advisor Bruce Reed.

References

Living people
1930 births
Democratic Party Idaho state senators
People from Klamath Falls, Oregon
Mills College alumni
People from Coeur d'Alene, Idaho
Women state legislators in Idaho